Est 501 to 562 was a class of 62 French  locomotives for express passenger service, built in 1878–1886 for the Chemins de fer de l'Est.

Construction history

The first series Est 501–510 was built 1878–1879 at the workshops of the Chemins de fer de l'Est in Épernay.
The general design of the frame was carried over from the earlier Crampton locomotives, but with an additional coupled axle replacing the second leading axle.
The first few machines had a round-top firebox which protruded down between the two driving axles, while the later machines of this series had a Belpaire firebox which extended over the second coupled axle.
The Cylinders were placed horizontally on both sides between the double longerons of the frame with the connecting rod directly driving the second driving axle.

The second series, comprising Est 511–542, was built in 1881–1882 in two subseries at Cail (1881) and Wiener Neustadt (1882).
The reversing mechanism of the Gooch valve gear was rearranged.

The third and last series, Est 543–562, was built 1884–1885.

Due to the increased weight the leading axle had been replaced by a two-axle outside-frame bogie.
Although these machines apparently did not meet the expectation, they still remained in service until 1925.

The locomotives were also renumbered to the range 2511–2562.

References

Bibliography

 

501
2-4-0 locomotives
Steam locomotives of France
Railway locomotives introduced in 1878
Standard gauge locomotives of France
Wiener Neustädter locomotives

Passenger locomotives